Włodzimierz Źróbik (1 July 1926 – 12 August 1994) was a Polish bobsledder. He competed in the four-man event at the 1956 Winter Olympics.

References

1926 births
1994 deaths
Polish male bobsledders
Olympic bobsledders of Poland
Bobsledders at the 1956 Winter Olympics
People from Mińsk County